Gergő Gőcze (born 30 April 1990, in Szombathely) is a Hungarian football player who currently plays for Sárvári FC.

Club statistics

Updated to games played as of 22 January 2016.

References

External links
HLSZ 

1990 births
Living people
Sportspeople from Szombathely
Hungarian footballers
Hungarian expatriate footballers
Association football goalkeepers
Szombathelyi Haladás footballers
Kozármisleny SE footballers
Pécsi MFC players
FC Ajka players
Kaposvári Rákóczi FC players
Puskás Akadémia FC players
Nemzeti Bajnokság I players
Nemzeti Bajnokság II players
Hungarian expatriate sportspeople in Austria
Expatriate footballers in Austria